A language model is a probability distribution over sequences of words. Given any sequence of words of length , a language model assigns a probability  to the whole sequence. Language models generate probabilities by training on text corpora in one or many languages. Given that languages can be used to express an infinite variety of valid sentences (the property of digital infinity), language modeling faces the problem of assigning non-zero probabilities to linguistically valid sequences that may never be encountered in the training data. Several modelling approaches have been designed to surmount this problem, such as applying the Markov assumption or using neural architectures such as recurrent neural networks or transformers.

Language models are useful for a variety of problems in computational linguistics; from initial applications in speech recognition to ensure nonsensical (i.e. low-probability) word sequences are not predicted, to wider use in machine translation (e.g. scoring candidate translations), natural language generation (generating more human-like text), part-of-speech tagging, parsing, optical character recognition, handwriting recognition, grammar induction, information retrieval, and other applications.

Language models are used in information retrieval in the query likelihood model. There, a separate language model is associated with each document in a collection. Documents are ranked based on the probability of the query  in the document's language model : . Commonly, the unigram language model is used for this purpose.

Since 2018, large language models (LLMs) consisting of deep neural networks with billions of trainable parameters, trained on massive datasets of unlabelled text, have demonstrated impressive results on a wide variety of natural language processing tasks. This development has led to a shift in research focus toward the use of general-purpose LLMs.

Model types

n-gram

Exponential 

Maximum entropy language models encode the relationship between a word and the n-gram history using feature functions. The equation is

In the simplest case, the feature function is just an indicator of the presence of a certain n-gram.

The log-bilinear model is another example of an exponential language model.

Neural network 

Neural language models (or continuous space language models) use continuous representations or embeddings of words to make their predictions. These models make use of neural networks.

Continuous space embeddings help to alleviate the curse of dimensionality in language modeling: as language models are trained on larger and larger texts, the number of unique words (the vocabulary) increases. The number of possible sequences of words increases exponentially with the size of the vocabulary, causing a data sparsity problem because of the exponentially many sequences. Thus, statistics are needed to properly estimate probabilities. Neural networks avoid this problem by representing words in a distributed way, as non-linear combinations of weights in a neural net. An alternate description is that a neural net approximates the language function. The neural net architecture might be feed-forward or recurrent, and while the former is simpler the latter is more common.

Typically, neural net language models are constructed and trained as probabilistic classifiers that learn to predict a probability distribution

That is, the network is trained to predict a probability distribution over the vocabulary, given some linguistic context. This is done using standard neural net training algorithms such as stochastic gradient descent with backpropagation. The context might be a fixed-size window of previous words, so that the network predicts

from a feature vector representing the previous  words. Another option is to use "future" words as well as "past" words as features, so that the estimated probability is

This is called a bag-of-words model. When the feature vectors for the words in the context are combined by a continuous operation, this model is referred to as the continuous bag-of-words architecture (CBOW).

A third option that trains slower than the CBOW but performs slightly better is to invert the previous problem and make a neural network learn the context, given a word. More formally, given a sequence of training words , one maximizes the average log-probability

where , the size of the training context, can be a function of the center word . This is called a skip-gram language model. Bag-of-words and skip-gram models are the basis of the word2vec program.

Instead of using neural net language models to produce actual probabilities, it is common to instead use the distributed representation encoded in the networks' "hidden" layers as representations of words; each word is then mapped onto an -dimensional real vector called the word embedding, where  is the size of the layer just before the output layer. The representations in skip-gram models have the distinct characteristic that they model semantic relations between words as linear combinations, capturing a form of compositionality. For example, in some such models, if  is the function that maps a word  to its -d vector representation, then

where ≈ is made precise by stipulating that its right-hand side must be the nearest neighbor of the value of the left-hand side.

Other 

A positional language model assesses the probability of given words occurring close to one another in a text, not necessarily immediately adjacent. Similarly, bag-of-concepts models leverage the semantics associated with multi-word expressions such as buy_christmas_present, even when they are used in information-rich sentences like "today I bought a lot of very nice Christmas presents".

Despite the limited successes in using neural networks, authors acknowledge the need for other techniques when modelling sign languages.

Evaluation and benchmarks 

Evaluation of the quality of language models is mostly done by comparison to human created sample benchmarks created from typical language-oriented tasks.  Other, less established, quality tests examine the intrinsic character of a language model or compare two such models. Since language models are typically intended to be dynamic and to learn from data it sees, some proposed models investigate the rate of learning, e.g. through inspection of learning curves. 

Various data sets have been developed to use to evaluate language processing systems. These include:

 Corpus of Linguistic Acceptability
 GLUE benchmark
 Microsoft Research Paraphrase Corpus
 Multi-Genre Natural Language Inference
 Question Natural Language Inference
 Quora Question Pairs
 Recognizing Textual Entailment
 Semantic Textual Similarity Benchmark
 SQuAD question answering Test
 Stanford Sentiment Treebank
 Winograd NLI
 BoolQ, PIQA, SIQA, HellaSwag, WinoGrande, ARC, OpenBookQA, NaturalQuestions, TriviaQA, RACE, MMLU (Measuring Massive Multitask Language Understanding), BIG-bench hard, GSM8k, RealToxicityPrompts, WinoGender, CrowS-Pairs. (LLaMa Benchmark)

Criticism 

Although contemporary language models, such as GPT-3, can be shown to match human performance on some tasks, it is not clear they are plausible cognitive models. For instance, recurrent neural networks have been shown to learn patterns humans do not learn and fail to learn patterns that humans do learn.

See also 

 Cache language model
 Deep linguistic processing
 Factored language model
 Generative pre-trained transformer
 Katz's back-off model
 Language technology
 Statistical model
 Ethics of artificial intelligence

Notes

References

Further reading 

 
 
 

Statistical natural language processing
Markov models